The Tojeiro Ecurie Ecosse is a sports racing car, designed, developed and built by British designer John Tojeiro, and raced by the Scottish racing team Ecurie Ecosse, between 1958 and 1963.

References

Sports racing cars
1960s cars
Cars of England